The 2019 North East Derbyshire District Council election took place on 2 May 2019 to elect members of North East Derbyshire District Council in England. This was on the same day as other local elections. The whole council was up for election on new boundaries. The Conservatives gained control of the council from the Labour Party for the first time ever.

Summary

Election result

|-

Ward Results

Ashover

Barlow and Holmesfield

Brampton and Walton

Clay Cross North

Clay Cross South

Coal Aston

Dronfield North

Dronfield South

Dronfield Woodhouse

Eckington North

Eckington South and Renishaw

Gosforth Valley

Grassmoor

Holmewood and Heath

Killamarsh East

Killamarsh West

North Wingfield Central

Pilsley and Morton

Ridgeway and Marsh Lane

Shirland

Sutton

Tupton

Unstone

Wingerworth

By-elections

Barlow & Holmesfield

Killamarsh East

Pilsey & Morton

References 

2019 English local elections
2019
2010s in Derbyshire
May 2019 events in the United Kingdom